The 1966 Campeonato Gaúcho was the 46th season of Rio Grande do Sul's top association football league. Grêmio won their 17th title.

Format 

The championship was contested by the twelve teams in a double round-robin system, with the team with the most points winning the title and qualifying to the 1967 Taça Brasil. The last placed team was relegated to the 1967 Second Division.

Teams 

A. Caxias was known as Flamengo until 1971.
B. Novo Hamburgo was known as Floriano from 1942 until 1968.

Championship

References

Campeonato Gaúcho seasons
1965 in Brazilian football leagues